Municipal elections were held in Essex County in Ontario on October 22, 2018 in conjunction with municipal elections across the province.

Essex County Council
Essex County Council consists of the 7 mainland mayors of Essex County and their seven deputy mayors.

Amherstburg

Mayor

Essex

Mayor

Kingsville

Mayor

Lakeshore

Mayor

Deputy Mayor

The results for Lakeshore Town Council is as follows:

Town Council

LaSalle

Mayor

Leamington

Mayor

Tecumseh

Mayor

References

Essex
Essex County, Ontario